John Jones (1728 – 1796) was an English  organist, who served at the St Paul's Cathedral.

Background
He was a chorister of St. Paul's Cathedral under Maurice Greene.

He was a composer of two volumes of harpsichord lessons, as well as some of the earliest Anglican psalm chants.

He married Sarah Chawner at Sudbury, Derbyshire.

He was buried in the chapel of Charterhouse London.

Career
Organist of:
Temple Church for Middle Temple 1749–1796
Charterhouse London 1753–1796
St Paul's Cathedral 1755–1796

References

External links
 

English classical organists
British male organists
Cathedral organists
1728 births
1796 deaths
18th-century keyboardists
Male classical organists